Kyle Rayner, one of the characters known as Green Lantern, is a superhero appearing in American comic books published by DC Comics. The character is depicted as being associated with the Green Lantern Corps, an extraterrestrial police force of which he has been a member.

In 2013, Kyle Rayner was placed 14th on IGN's list of the "Top 25 Heroes of DC Comics".

Publication history
Created by writer Ron Marz and artist Darryl Banks, and named after a character from James Cameron's film The Terminator, Kyle Rayner first appeared in Green Lantern vol. 3, #48 (1994), as part of the "Emerald Twilight" storyline, in which DC Comics replaced Green Lantern Hal Jordan with Rayner, who was the sole Green Lantern for years until the late 1990s. He was DC's star Green Lantern into the mid-2000s. During this period he was also briefly known as Ion.

Following Jordan’s return to Green Lantern status in the 2004–2005 limited series Green Lantern: Rebirth, and the 2005 crossover storyline "Infinite Crisis", Rayner returned to his alias of Ion. After the events of the "Sinestro Corps War", Rayner returned to his original role as a Green Lantern officer, along with a promotion to Honor Guard Illustres of the Corps. Later on, he becomes a White Lantern following the mastery of all seven lantern rings. After DC Rebirth, Rayner again returns as Green Lantern, along with his original Corps uniform.

Fictional character biography

The last Green Lantern

Before he acquired a Green Lantern power ring, Kyle Rayner was a struggling-but-gifted freelance comic book artist who was raised in North Hollywood and lived and worked in Los Angeles. Kyle was raised by his Irish mother as an only child; his father abandoned his mother when she was pregnant. It was later revealed that his father was a Mexican-American CIA agent named Gabriel Vasquez and that Aaron Rayner was merely an alias. Kyle and his mother lived a modest lifestyle until he reached adulthood. After Hal Jordan, grief-stricken over the destruction of his home town of Coast City, went on a mad rampage killing various members of the Green Lantern Corps and the Guardians of the Universe, Rayner was found by the last surviving Guardian of the Universe, Ganthet. Ganthet gave Kyle the last working Green Lantern power ring that would allow him to conjure any form of matter or energy through sheer force of will. Ganthet's reasons for choosing Kyle to bear the ring have never been made completely apparent, aside from Rayner having been in the right place at the right time: prior to bequeathing the ring upon Rayner, Ganthet simply utters, "You will have to do." Ganthet later revealed that humans make great Green Lanterns (before Hal Jordan's mental breakdown he was the Corps' greatest Green Lantern, and John Stewart became the first mortal Guardian of the Universe). Several sources, however, imply that Ganthet was following a deeper reason: Kyle Rayner was not chosen because he was fearless but because he was able to feel and overcome fear, thus making him, and all the future Lanterns, less susceptible to Parallax's influence. The New Guardians retelling goes so far as to replace the scowling "You will have to do" with a smiling "It would seem I chose well."

At first, Kyle took possession of the ring very lightly. His girlfriend, Alexandra DeWitt, encouraged him to be more responsible, create his own version of the Green Lantern uniform, and helped him train for his new role as a superhero, but she was later murdered and stuffed in a refrigerator by the supervillain Major Force. The guilt over this event drove Rayner to take his role more seriously, and as a result, he strove to be the best Green Lantern he could be in honor of Alex's memory. Rayner then moved to New York City, since Los Angeles reminded him of Alex and he needed a fresh start.

Rayner grew up enamored with Superman and Batman, though he had only a passing knowledge of Earth's various Green Lanterns. This soon changed, and he found that the Green Lantern ring was the ultimate expression of his fertile imagination. While in battle, he often used the ring's power to create constructs of just about anything his artistic mind could imagine: other superheroes, anime characters, mystical characters, mechas, futuristic weapons, and original characters from his comic books. While other members of the Green Lantern Corps questioned the practicality of those constructs, they often made Rayner an unpredictable and formidable opponent.

Justice League
After relocating to New York City, Rayner joined the superhero group the Titans for a brief time, during which he dated Donna Troy, but eventually became a member of the Justice League (JLA). He initially clashed with the Flash (Wally West) early in his career. West had worked with Jordan since childhood and had reservations about Kyle as the new Green Lantern, but he eventually became one of Rayner's best friends and biggest supporters. Surprisingly, another of Kyle's biggest supporters amongst the League was Batman, who often treated him with more respect than he showed certain other League members (including his predecessors as Green Lantern—Jordan, Gardner, and Stewart), most likely due to the fact that Kyle was willing to learn from others where other Lanterns focused on their rings and pre-existing skills. Rayner also entered a romantic relationship with Jade and formed friendships with the Golden Age Green Lantern (Jade's father, Alan Scott), Green Arrow (Connor Hawke), Arsenal (Roy Harper), Warrior (Guy Gardner), and John Stewart (who at the time was a former Green Lantern).

During his superhero career, Rayner accumulated a rogues gallery that included characters from his predecessors' pasts such as Dr. Polaris and Dr. Light.

Oblivion

During the Fifth-week event "Circle of Fire", it is discovered that a cosmic entity named Oblivion is coming to Earth after he attacked the planet Rann. This shocked Rayner because the villain is strikingly identical to the character of a story Rayner made when he was seven during his period of struggling with his fear and anger of growing up without a father, as a nemesis to the adventurer the Cannoneer. The Justice League tries to stop Oblivion, and during the battle, Kyle is sent back to Earth to get reinforcements, but the League is captured. On Earth, Kyle recruits Power Girl, the Atom, Firestorm, Adam Strange, and the Circle of Fire — a group of Green Lanterns from alternate realities and different time periods. The Circle of Fire consists of Rayner's late girlfriend Alexandra DeWitt from an alternate timeline (where she had received the power ring instead of Rayner); Hunter and Forest Rayner, cousins descended from Rayner who share one power ring; Ali Rayner-West, Green Lightning, a future descendant of Wally West and Kyle Rayner who possesses both the Flash and Green Lantern's powers but could only use one of those powers at a time; a reprogrammed Manhunter robot model G.L.7177.6; and Pel Tavin, the Emerald Knight, a Daxamite Green Lantern from the Middle Ages.

Finding himself in a role as a leader, Rayner split this group up to handle different crises caused by Oblivion, or in some cases to search for a way to defeat him. Eventually, in a confrontation, Oblivion reveals that he is a distillation of Rayner's doubts and darker impulses, made manifest through the power of the ring. The villain also reveals that Rayner has subconsciously created the Circle of Fire based on his positive aspects because he needed help; Alex is an embodiment of Rayner's capability for love, while Tavin represents his bravery, Ali represents hope, G.L.7177.6 represents logic, and Hunter and Forest represent his imagination. When they realize this, they decide that the created Green Lanterns should return to Rayner's mind. Doing so allows him to unlock more powers from the ring that had been previously unavailable to him and also discovers an inner strength he never knew he possesses after his positive aspects return to him. Facing up to this, Rayner is able to defeat Oblivion in New York City, imprison the entity within his own mind, and free the Justice League.

Ion

For a brief period, Rayner achieved godhood as Ion after absorbing the energy Hal Jordan had left in Earth's Sun during "The Final Night" storyline, which had merged and grown with energies released after Oblivion's defeat. With his new powers, Rayner could bend time, space, and reality, allowing himself, for a good example, to be in many places at once. The drawback of being one with everything was that Rayner could no longer sleep or separate himself from the overwhelming responsibilities these abilities imposed upon him. Rather than sacrifice his humanity, Rayner abandoned omnipotence, bleeding off the vast power, recharging the Central Power Battery on the Guardians' home planet and headquarters, Oa, and helping to create a new group of Guardians in the process. Before he purged all of the power, though, he modified his ring and conjured a new Corps uniform to reflect his new maturity. Once again limited only by his willpower and imagination, Rayner's ring could still affect yellow and would always harbor a lifeline of power without a time limit on its power, is keyed directly to him, and would always return to him, though it still required charging to reach full power.

After the brutal gay bashing of his young assistant and friend Terry Berg, Rayner went on a lengthy self-imposed exile into space. Before leaving, he placed John Stewart, recently recovered from his paraplegia and given a new power ring, into his spot in the Justice League. On his return, he discovered that Jade had begun seeing someone new and was doing so in his own apartment. He left New York and spent some time trying once again to find his place on Earth and ended up staying with his mother for a brief time.

Green Lantern: Rebirth

After being tricked into believing his mother had been murdered by Major Force, Rayner fights with the villain, eventually dealing with the immortal by decapitating him and shooting his head into space. Feeling that he is a danger to those he cares for, Rayner once again leaves for the far reaches of space. During the events of the miniseries Green Lantern: Rebirth, he returns with Jordan's corpse and the discovery of the true nature of Parallax, which is revealed to actually be an alien parasitic entity, the non-corporeal embodiment of fear, that possessed Jordan and committed crimes in his name. Subsequent to this, Rayner is given special status amongst the Guardians, who consider him the "Torch-Bearer", the Green Lantern who carried the legacy through the Corps' darkest period.

Infinite Crisis and the return of Ion
In Infinite Crisis, Alexander Luthor reveals that had the Multiverse continued to exist if the event of Crisis on Infinite Earths hadn't occurred, Rayner would have been a native of Earth-Eight. When Jade dies during the Infinite Crisis Rann/Thanagar War Special, she transfers her power to Rayner, catalyzing his transformation into Ion.

In the series Ion: Guardian of the Universe, Ion seemingly destroys a fleet of starships and violently attacks two Green Lanterns, but Kyle has no memory of the destruction and only learns of his possible role in it after being attacked by a bounty hunter. Upon visiting the fleet's wreckage, Rayner loses control and finds himself near the sentient planet Mogo, also a Green Lantern, who uses his Lantern abilities to help convalescing Lanterns gain insight into their problems through the use of constructs conjured by the Lantern's own subconscious. On Mogo, Rayner converses with images of Alex, Donna, and Jade and fights Major Force. Rayner realizes that as Ion, he is able to channel the green energy of both the Starheart and the Central Power Battery. This new energy is called the "Ion Power".

Later, Jordan finds Ion destroying a planet but discovers that this is in fact Alexander Nero, who claims that his connection with Kyle and new powers are the result of a third party's interference. Jordan and Rayner then discover that the Guardians had placed Rayner through these events as a test of whether he could handle his power, in anticipation of their granting him an honored position among Green Lanterns as their Torchbearer, now that he harbors the ability to revive the Corps should it ever be destroyed again. They explain that he will not patrol a sector as other Lanterns do but will be called upon for aid in situations that the Corps cannot handle alone. They also reveal that some unforeseen enemy manipulated Nero, who unleashes a massive amount of energy that Kyle dissipates into what is presumed to be a pocket universe. Rayner later learns that he was hunted by enemies such as Effigy, who was subliminally instructed to attack Rayner by Nero. After clearing his reputation on the planet that was scorched by Nero while using Rayner's identity, Rayner learns his mother is dying of an unknown cause. After being attacked by the Tangent Comics version of the Atom and the Flash, and being transported to the interdimensional realm known as the "Bleed", where he encounters Captain Atom, he returns home to attempt to reanimate his now-dead mother's corpse with newly acquired powers, but after a tearful farewell, she declines resurrection, asking Rayner to allow her to die, a request that the grief-stricken Rayner grants.

Sinestro Corps War

Sinestro abducts Rayner from Oa through one of his new yellow power rings. At the Sinestro Corps' base on Qward, he reveals to Kyle that he was responsible for his mother's death and infected her with the sentient virus Despotellis to kill her in a plot to break Rayner's will so that he could serve as Parallax's new host. Sinestro also reveals that Ion is actually a benevolent energy entity, similar to Parallax, that thrives on willpower and that Rayner was unknowingly its current host.

The Sinestro Corps confront Kyle, who has his powers drained out of him by Sinestro himself and is immediately taken over by Parallax. Parallax then clothes itself in a new uniform, which appears as a combination of the Sinestro Corps' uniform, Kyle's original Green Lantern costume, and the armor Hal Jordan wore as Parallax. Parallax's possession also turns the hair on top of Kyle's head gray, just as it turned the hair on Hal Jordan's temples. Parallax returns to Qward with the Sinestro Corps and is inducted into their ranks, becoming one of the Anti-Monitor's heralds.

In Kyle's body, Parallax captured Hal Jordan, Guy Gardner, and John Stewart and brought them to Qward. Before bringing them, Parallax made Hal relive the only time he ever experienced fear: when his father died. Parallax also elaborated that since invading Kyle's mind, he now has nearly infinite creativity to call upon in his deeds. During the battle with the Green Lantern Corps, who arrive at Qward to rescue the captured Lanterns, Parallax murders Jack T. Chance and crushes his Power Ring before it can find a replacement. During his fight with the Earth Green Lanterns, Parallax revealed that Kyle Rayner's "twisted desire" was to be the last Green Lantern again and thus "special". He is stopped from murdering Guy Gardner by the intervention of the surviving Lost Lanterns and the Ion entity. The Embodiment of Fear then led an advance group of the Sinestro Corps, readying to attack Coast City. It is also suggested by the Guardians of the Universe that Kyle is no longer destined to be Ion following his being taken over by Parallax.

As seen in the one-shot Parallax (September 2007) Kyle was trapped within his own mind. He is able to witness all that Parallax says and does from a third-person perspective but is unable to stop it. Kyle's personality watches Parallax's actions from inside the prison that his own imagination has constructed: his mother's empty house. The only fixture in the house is an old painting of uncertain origin and authorship that had belonged to Kyle's mother. As Kyle watches Parallax battle Hal Jordan and the Lost Lanterns a manifestation of the fear entity comes to pay him a visit. In the realm of his imagination, Kyle is able to "transform" into Ion and engage the parasite in battle. After being blasted back by Parallax and losing his Ion form, Kyle forms a power ring, places it on his finger, and appears in his original costume. Although he puts up a valiant fight, Parallax is too much for him, and Kyle is defeated. Parallax taunts Kyle with his deepest fear: failing the people who depend on him, especially the women in his life. Many of the women in Kyle's life have died or come to harm because of their association with him, and this causes Kyle to struggle with feelings of guilt and responsibility. The latest to die was Kyle's mother, killed by the sentient virus Despotellis on the orders of Sinestro. It was the grief and guilt that this revelation caused Kyle that allowed the Parallax entity to possess him. Sneering, Parallax mocks Kyle's helplessness and turns to depart, but the enraged artist grabs a pencil and stabs the creature in the eye with it. Parallax, unfazed and unhurt, taunts Kyle once more with the hopelessness of his position and disappears. Left alone, Kyle is about to smash the painting in frustration when he notices his mother's signature in the bottom corner and realizes that she secretly painted it years ago. This deep and unexpected connection with his mother gives Kyle hope, the very thing he most needs to overcome his fear. With renewed faith in himself, Kyle walks into the painting and ends up in a field walking toward a bright, green star.

Green Lantern again
After threatening Hal's brother and family in Coast City, Parallax is confronted by Hal Jordan, who is enraged by the entity's attempt to take James Jordan's life as well as possession of Kyle. Surprisingly, Jordan actually manages to beat Parallax consistently in fury but loses the charge in his ring before he's able to defeat him completely. While visibly weakened, Jordan becomes absorbed by Parallax in addition to Rayner, and Parallax takes a new physical form with a bright yellow costume, a sign that he is a creature capable of inducing great fear.

Meanwhile, fellow Lantern John Stewart orders Honor Guard Lantern Guy Gardner to retrieve the painting (Kyle had discussed the painting in the Sinestro Corps Special, as well as the Tales of the Sinestro Corps: Parallax one-shot) of a little boy in a field, which was hanging in Kyle's dead mother's house. As Guy returns and shows the painting to Parallax, it visibly shifts his demeanor. Jordan, the beacon of green light that had come to Kyle inside his mind, assists Rayner in fighting Parallax exhaustively until they finally break free from the fear embodiment's grip.

Just as the now-separated Parallax creature counterattacks the Lanterns, ousted Guardians Ganthet and Sayd arrive with four Lantern Power Batteries, and they proceed to entrap Parallax within them all. Ganthet explains that his final act as a Guardian is to give Rayner his power ring. The Guardian asks Rayner if he is willing to downgrade himself to a regulation Green Lantern after serving as host to Ion for so long. Kyle quickly agrees, and the four officers then take their batteries, recite the oath, and recharge their rings.

The four Green Lanterns then split in two directions; Hal returns to Coast City to prevent it from being destroyed again with Kyle by his side, and John and Guy head to New York City to battle the Anti-Monitor, Superboy-Prime, and Cyborg Superman. As Hal and Kyle battle Sinestro, Sinestro momentarily gains the upper hand after one of the Manhunters absorbs their power ring's energies. After the Green Lantern Corps defeat the Cyborg Superman, the Manhunters immediately deactivate, with Hal able to take one of the robots' skulls to absorb Sinestro's power. With three of them powerless, Hal and Kyle immediately engage Sinestro in combat, with the two Lanterns emerging as the victors against the despotic Korugarian.

After the war, he is assigned to the Honor Guard as Guy Gardner's partner and sent to counsel Sodam Yat, the new Ion. Kyle and Guy decide to move to Oa, giving them better access to performing their duties. Kyle places his mother's painting on the wall of his new Oan apartment. The Ion is now stated as unrelated to the Starheart Power given to him by Jade: Such sudden spike in powers enabled the Guardians to temporarily bond the Ion entity with Kyle. With the loss of the Ion entity, Rayner again has the powers and abilities of a standard Green Lantern. 

Since his promotion to Honor Guard, Rayner has acted as a troubleshooter for the Corps, participating in actions such as the defeat of Sinestro Corps member Mongul and the capture of Sinestro Corps member Krybb. Following this, Rayner and Lantern Soranik Natu began a romantic relationship.

Countdown and beyond

In Countdown, Weeks 49-47, Kyle Rayner is among those "anomalies" listed by the Monitors as being dangerous to the Universe, so he is on their list for termination. Also on the list are Duela Dent, Donna Troy, and Jason Todd.

Rayner briefly appears in All-New Atom #15, once again carrying a Green Lantern ring (through his narration, Rayner makes it clear that he is no longer Ion, stating that he "[has] to change [his] business cards"). He now joins Donna Troy, Jason Todd, Bob the Monitor, and the Jokester in the Countdown Presents the Search for Ray Palmer. This story takes place after the events of the "Sinestro Corps War", though it was started while the war was still ongoing in the Green Lantern and Green Lantern Corps series. Rayner's new uniform is an amalgamation of his previous Lantern uniforms and elements of the traditional version, as well as his original mask.

When the challengers finally locate Ray Palmer (on Earth-51) Bob attacks him, revealing his acts of assistance to be a ruse. Kyle escapes with Ray, who reveals that it was the deceased Earth-51 Ray Palmer who was meant to stop the great disaster, not him. The two are then attacked by Power Ring and evil versions of Booster Gold and Supergirl. While the battle between Monarch and Superboy-Prime rages, the hand of the Source urges the Challengers to go to Apokolips. With the help of Earth-51's Monitor, Nix Uotan, the group manages to leave before Superboy-Prime tears open Monarch's armor, obliterating that entire universe.

After Darkseid's defeat, Rayner joins Donna, Ray, and Forager in becoming border guards to the Multiverse.

Blackest Night

Continuing his duties as a Green Lantern Honor Guard member, Rayner moved to Oa, running a new version of the Warriors Bar with Guy Gardner and continuing his relationship with Soranik Natu, secretly breaking one of the ten new laws in the book of Oa unveiled by the Guardians: No relationships between Green Lanterns. He had been involved in the lead-up to "The Blackest Night", being one of the first to deal with a new Star Sapphires member, and fought on Oa after the Guardian Scar caused a mass prison break of Sinestro Corpsmen.

After the prison break, the Alpha Lanterns were ordered by the Guardians to execute all Sinestro Corps members and all other prisoners. Rayner and Guy opposed this, cautioning the Alphas and the Guardians to avoid the dark path to which such actions would lead, but the Guardians ignored this, reassigning Rayner and Guy to Earth for their opposition to their decree. After briefly returning to Earth, the two Lanterns returned to Oa, encountering an immense swarm of black rings, which reanimated all the deceased Lanterns in Oa's crypts, bringing Kyle face to face with the reanimated corpse of Jade. Having learned that these Black Lanterns are not truly the deceased persons they once were but grotesque mockeries, Rayner tries to destroy them, but the false Jade torments Rayner with images of people he has failed in the past. The false Jade is destroyed by Natu.

During the Black Lanterns' attack upon the Central Power Battery on Oa, Alpha Lantern Chaselon's internal power battery was breached. Anticipating its detonation, and after professing his love for Natu, Kyle sacrificed himself by grabbing it and using it to destroy as many Black Lanterns as he could. Black rings attempt to resurrect Rayner as a Black Lantern, but they are destroyed by the Corps, Munk of the Indigo Tribe, and Miri Riam of the Star Sapphires, whose power embodies love. Having sensed the love between Kyle and Soranik in jeopardy, she uses her power to connect Kyle's heart to Natu's and restores Rayner to life. Journeying to Earth, Rayner battles a Black Lantern version of Alexandra DeWitt, where he helps defeat the Black Lantern Corps leader, Nekron. In the aftermath, some of the Black Lanterns are restored to life, including Jade.

War of the Green Lanterns

When the rogue Guardian Krona attacks Oa, he places Parallax back inside the Central Power Battery, enabling him to control the Green Lanterns through fear. Due to his past experiences with Parallax, Kyle is able to resist the effects but is forced to remove his ring to prevent himself from losing control. Tasked by Ganthet to flee, Kyle and John Stewart make their way into Oa's underground. While there, they encounter Guy and Hal, who has the rings of the other Corps leaders. Kyle, taking Ganthet's earlier declaration that he was putting his "hopes" in him to heart, chooses Saint Walker's ring, while Hal chooses Sinestro's, Guy chooses Atrocitus's, and John chooses Indigo-1's. However, the blue ring has the effect of supercharging the attacking Green Lanterns' rings, severely impeding the Earthmen's defense. While Hal and Guy go to remove Parallax from the Central Power Battery, Kyle and John attempt to free Mogo from Krona's control. On the way, Kyle discovers the blue ring's ability to show a person their greatest hope can free the Lanterns from Krona's control. Unfortunately, it does not work on Mogo, due to the residual Black Lantern energy in his core. Kyle can only watch in horror as John absorbs the Black Lantern energy, along with all the Green Lantern energy, and uses it to destroy Mogo. In the fallout, the two regroup with Hal, Guy, and Ganthet, using the full power of the emotional spectrum to crack open the Battery and release Parallax. Their job done, the Lanterns regain their original green rings, in preparation for the final confrontation with Krona. In the final battle, Hal takes Kyle to the Book of the Black and makes him draw a picture of Sinestro, Carol Ferris, and the others Lanterns trapped in the Book, which effectively frees them from their prison.

In the aftermath of the war, Kyle and Soranik are forced to deal with their relationship issues. Kyle talks with Tomar-Tu about his problems with Soranik, but they, along with Soranik, are teleported into an alien world ravaged by Star Sapphire Miri Riam. The Lanterns subdue Miri, who reveals to them that she did not kill anyone on the planet and she only damaged property to force Kyle and Soranik to reunite and solve their problems, reminding them of the time when she used her crystal to reveal to them their respective true loves. However, Kyle reveals that when Miri showed him his true love, he saw Jade, not Soranik. He justified himself saying that although Jade was the love of his life, she was dead and he needed to move on. Angered, Soranik breaks up with Kyle, telling him not to enter her sector.

The New 52

After the "War of the Green Lanterns", Kyle resumes his functions on Earth, using his signature creative constructs to save construction workers caught in a construction accident. Elsewhere in the universe, yellow, red, violet, and indigo power ring bearers are decommissioned, and their rings set out for Sector 2814 (Earth). After saving the construction workers, the four rings approach Kyle, each claiming him as their new bearer. Confused by the appearance of the rings, Kyle is soon ambushed by the decommissioned bearers' peers (consisting of Arkillo, Bleez, Fatality, and Munk), who have tracked the rings to Kyle and have come to retrieve them.

As Kyle fights the four lanterns, a blue ring appears, claiming Kyle as its bearer. Soon afterward, Saint Walker appears, having tracked the ring's trajectory, and helps Kyle reach Oa to try to understand what is happening. On their way an orange ring reaches Kyle, with Saint Walker claiming if the orange ring had come to Kyle, and since only one orange ring exists, it means that its former bearer must be dead. On Oa, Kyle tries to talk to Ganthet, only to discover that the Guardians have removed all emotion from him, and Ganthet now acts just like all the other Guardians of the Universe. When the Guardians try to capture Kyle and forcibly discover what turned the Green Lantern into a magnet for the different Corps' rings, the six rings impose themselves on Kyle, turning him into the first entity to bear all seven Lantern Corps' rings. Despite some initial success, Kyle's body is eventually unable to keep up the strain of wielding all of his new rings, with five of the new rings destroyed after a few moments, leaving just the orange ring along with his green ring. Ganthet attempts to remove Kyle's green ring and dismiss him from the Corps, but the ring itself reacts violently to this attempt to remove it. The orange ring is revealed to be a construct of Glomulus, who asks Kyle for help, with the other ring-bearers arriving to either assist or attack Kyle. When the Guardians forcefully strike down the lanterns save for Glomulus, Larfleeze himself shows up and attacks the Guardians. Accompanied by Sayd, Larfleeze attacks the Guardians, but when Kyle hears Sayd imply that there is a way to restore Ganthet to normal, he joins forces with the other ring-wielders and flees the Guardians, essentially resigning from the Corps while retaining his ring. Talking with Larfleeze, they learn that the rings were drawn to Kyle due to the actions of a mysterious spaceship that has just entered this universe. Larfleeze sent Glommulus to investigate it since he was able to resist the "compulsion" of the source that tried to remove his ring due to his prolonged contact with it, and the new team resolved to investigate this new threat. When they are attacked by the mysterious and powerful Archangel Invictus, who claims that all who wield the rings are evil, Kyle sends out a message to the other ring-wielders by convincing his ring to tap into his own emotions of hope, fear, and compassion to "tune in" to the appropriate "wavelength". Learning of Invictus's past history with Larfleeze, Kyle is able to trick him into letting the ring-bearers go by claiming that they will kill Larfleeze for him. With his ring low on power, Kyle returns to Earth with Bleez to recharge his ring, Bleez suggesting that Kyle will need protection from the Guardians after his expulsion while retaining his ring. Although he fails to reach the Blue Lanterns in time to save them from the invading Reach, Kyle is able to lead the New Guardians to fight Larfleeze and Invictus, subsequently learning that Sayd was responsible for turning him into a "ring magnet" in the hope that he would be able to bring the seven Corps together to save Ganthet, as both the only person who loved Ganthet as much as her and the only person able to wield all the powers of the emotional spectrum. Despite learning the truth about their origins, the New Guardians split up since they feel that the circumstances of their origin have tainted the team from the beginning regardless of Sayd's motives.

Rise of the Third Army
Attempting to track down Hal, Kyle meets Carol Ferris just as they witness a news report about Hal and Sinestro's fight with Black Hand, prompting Carol to re-don her Sapphire ring to help Kyle battle the Black Lanterns, only to find nothing but "conventional" zombies. Although Kyle's ring states that Hal was apparently dead, Carol rejects this idea as the link between her heart and Hal's, which she is aware of although her ring is still intact. Through a vision from her ring, Carol realizes that Kyle must unite the powers of all seven Corps to stop this latest threat, despite Kyle's uncertainty about his ability to channel the powers of rage or avarice even if he has already accessed the powers of hope and fear. Carol is able to contact Atrocitus to help train Kyle to harness the red ring of rage by arguing that Kyle will use that power against the Guardians. He attempts to provoke Kyle's rage by reminding him of the death of his girlfriend Alex after he got the ring, but when this fails, Kyle instead feeling grief rather than anger, he takes Kyle to witness a group of people being threatened and executed in another country, Kyle's anger at this provoking the activation of the red power within him, also turning him disturbingly cold toward the desecration of Alex's grave. Although Arkillo and Larfleeze are able to help him harness the powers of fear and greed, it takes a confrontation with Ganthet to help Kyle harness the power of love since Kyle accepts his refusal to harm Ganthet despite what he has become due to his fatherly regard for Ganthet. With his powers at their peak, Kyle resolves to lead the Guardians in the confrontation against the Third Army.

The Wrath of the First Lantern
When the villainous First Lantern is freed, he began to drain all the Lantern Corps of their emotions, minds, and memories of the various beings present with the intention of seeing how their life choices had changed them. Kyle failed to fight off the First Lantern, which also has the powers of the white light and drains his emotions. The First Lantern teleports him back to his old home, leaving him weak. Later, Carol locates Kyle, who resists from his critical weak state, while Kyle and Carol arrive at the planet Korugar's grave when Sinestro rages to attack them, blaming everyone for his home planet being destroyed. Sinestro demands Kyle revive Korugar with the White Lantern ring's abilities, but Kyle is unable to do so. Sinestro flies off vowing to kill the First Lantern, while Kyle and Carol later team-up with Green Lanterns Simon Baz and B'dg.

In the final battle, Kyle and the reserve Lantern Corps attack the First Lantern, and he is finally destroyed. Afterwards, Kyle travels to Earth and helps other people with the White Lantern's miracle power on his own. However, he is confronted by Saint Walker, who convinces him that he has to visit his own father, considering that Kyle has not seen him since the First Lantern's attack. Later, Kyle arrives in Arizona and reunites with his father in his filling station.

"Lights Out"
After the events of the "Lights Out" storyline, in which Relic destroys Oa and the emotional spectrum, Rayner is believed dead after sacrificing his life to kill Relic. It is later revealed that he is in fact alive, and his survival will not be revealed to the Green Lantern Corps. Soon enough Kyle discovered that when he went past the Source Wall with the purpose to deliver the emotional entities there so that the reservoir could be refilled he also saw the instructions that shape the Universe, and he somehow changed the operating codes. Without even realizing it, Kyle created Oblivion from everything that gnawed deep in the corners of his mind—the anxiety, the endless wants, the fears, and the anger given form. Realizing that his power has grown too great for him to keep it all under control, Kyle subconsciously creates the Oblivion entity to destroy himself so that he cannot endanger anyone else. However, various other ring-wielders, including Carol and the repowered Saint Walker, band together and convince him to have hope, resulting in Kyle working with the Templar Guardians into defeating Oblivion. In doing so, Kyle seems to be destroyed, but in fact, teleported to a dead planet. He revives the dead world, to find that it's a world like Mogo. The world speaks saying it was destroyed by its brother for killing its own populace. After stating that it doesn't like lanterns, it attacks Kyle in an attempt to kill him. He takes back the life that he bestowed on the dead planet.

Recognizing that the white light is too powerful for him to control full-time, Kyle decides to split his ring between himself and six other allies, allowing the option of the rings recombining into one if Kyle is faced with a serious threat.

DC Rebirth
Subsequently, in DC Rebirth, Kyle Rayner is one of the several individuals who feel the tremors of the green light of willpower when Hal Jordan forges a Green Power Ring for himself. When Hal is left badly wounded and in a realm between life and death after a confrontation with Sinestro, his ring travels to Ganthet and Sayd, who summon Kyle to help save Hal's life. Kyle uses the power of his white ring and the former Guardians' power to open a doorway to Emerald Space in the afterlife, and manages to bring Hal back to the realm of the living. After the new truce between the Sinestro and Green Lantern Corps, Kyle attempts to use his ring to help Saint Walker bring the rest of the Blue Lantern Corps back to life, but some external force prevents Kyle channeling his power to that extent, resulting in him 'downgrading' back to a conventional Green Lantern ring as the strain he had subjected his ring to causes it to 'break up' back into the seven differently-colored rings, with Kyle retaining his original Green Lantern ring while the other six flies off to find new wielders. Kyle begins to initiate another relationship with Soranik. During the fight against the Prism Beasts, Kyle learns from the future Green Power Ring that Rip Hunter possessed, that Sarko is Kyle's and Soranik's future son. After Sarko's death, Kyle is left demoralized and makes him more persistent to bring Soranik back to the Green Lantern Corp. Eventually she finds out about Kyle killing Sarko and falls under the influence of the Yellow Lantern and brands Kyle. She then attacks the Green Lanterns after finding out about one of their own killing a Yellow Lantern and later finds out the Power Battery had a fail-safe that prevents them from using it if they were to turn on them which makes her even more furious and retreats with her Corp.

Later the Green Lantern Corp's intergalactic homeworld and safe haven of Oa suffered a devasting attack from unidentified assailants which brought considerable losses to the Green Lanterns themselves when the mysterious force successfully rendered the Green Central Power Battery completely extinguished and irrevocably scattered several Lanterns across space with John Stewart, the newly instated councilor Sojourner Mullein, former Red Lantern liaison Simon Baz and Mullein's rambunctious but courageous young sidekick Keli Quintela a.k.a. Teen Lantern as the only available Green Lanterns with the remaining Lanterns either dead, injured or missing. Kyle Rayner and Guy Gardner are soon eventually reported to be missing in action.

Powers and abilities

As a Green Lantern, Kyle Rayner is semi-invulnerable, capable of projecting hard-light constructions, flight, and utilizing various other abilities through his power ring which are only limited by his imagination and willpower. Kyle's constructs are much more elaborate than those of any other Green Lanterns, often fading into view like a sketch refined into an illustration. Eventually, he is able to utilize his skill as an artist to manipulate the pigments and dimensions within his constructs, making them appear so realistic that even Alan Scott was amazed at what Kyle could do with his ring's creations.

Rayner's ring was constructed from what remained of Hal Jordan's ring by Ganthet. It is keyed to Rayner and Hal Jordan's DNA, making it only accessible to Rayner, Jordan, and anyone who is closely related to them unless the bearer willed the ring to another individual. This is done by Ganthet to prevent the last ring from being stolen, as there would be no other lantern to send to retrieve it. Unlike most of the Green Lanterns' rings, Kyle's did not require a twenty-four-hour period of recharge, only when the ring's capacity was depleted; and it was not necessary to recite the Corps' oath when recharged. Rayner is the first Lantern not to suffer from a weakness to items colored yellow. Both Mongul and Superman are surprised at this upon first encountering him. Kyle states that he didn't know about the weakness and never had any trouble with it. Originally, this was explained as his ring being a "new model", which also explained why it had slightly different abilities than those seen previously. Later, this was retconned with the explanation that rings can affect yellow if the user faces and overcomes their fear; as an artist, Kyle had faced his fear of rejection every time he showed his work, and this extended to his constructs, which he considered part of his artwork.

When bonded with the benevolent Ion symbiont, Rayner was capable of much more elaborate usage of his imagination which can extend to the manipulation of reality. In possession of the more sinister Parallax entity, Rayner was theoretically capable of similar feats.

During his relationship with Donna Troy, Rayner engaged in combat training with his then-girlfriend. During his first battle with Fatality, he proved to be a formidable fighter and was able to defeat her when his ring was drained. In nearly every encounter with Fatality since that incident, Kyle would use his combat skills to defeat her rather than his ring to maintain an element of surprise (she expected him to use his ring) or when his ring is drained or absent during battles. As a member of the Justice League, Kyle occasionally would train in the League's combat training systems on the Watchtower and under the tutelage of combat-experienced Leaguers, such as Batman. Even though Rayner is now a skilled hand-to-hand combatant, having been trained by the Dark Knight himself, he is not an expert in hand-to-hand; for example, while he initially held his own in a hand-to-hand fight with Sinestro, the villain proved to be a better fighter due to his greater experience.

As an Honor Guard Illustres, Rayner ranks only below Salaak, who holds the rank of Clarissi, and the Guardians in the new Corps chain of command.

During a brief period where he was turned into a 'magnet' for all rings, Kyle could briefly wield the power of the entire emotional spectrum, but the strain of doing so meant that the other six rings disintegrated after only a few moments, leaving him feeling significantly weakened by the effort. Despite all of the rings barring his own turning to dust, a measure of each ring's power resides in Kyle which he is able to channel in a combined burst of multicolored lights, Sayd noting that Kyle is the only being she knows capable of bringing together the powers of all of the branches of the emotional spectrum. The ability to use any emotion spectrum light appears to be permanent, as Kyle is learning from different members of each Corps on how to use each power individually with limited success; he harnessed the power of Hope with relative ease, but required a brutal training session with Atrocitus to master Rage, while he only harnessed the power of Love during his fight with Ganthet.

After learning to master Avarice from a reluctant Larfleeze, Fear from Arkillo, and Compassion from Indigo-1 Kyle has learned how to harness the entire emotional spectrum and as a result became a White Lantern. As a White Lantern Kyle can heal injuries and ailments although by his own admission he can't resurrect the dead. His ring is more powerful than a standard power ring and can replicate the abilities of any ring in the spectrum (except black) though the full extent of its abilities is yet to be revealed.

Kyle was later revealed to possess the Life Equation as a result of being inside the Source Wall. With the Equation, Kyle could manipulate reality itself. However, Kyle was unable to control this level of power and was dying because of it. As a result, Kyle divided the Life Equation by creating seven additional White Lantern power rings and gave them to the most worthy candidates. He swore to never unite the rings unless absolutely necessary. In the Rebirth storyline, when Kyle attempted to use the white ring to resurrect the Blue Lantern Corps, some unspecified force resisted his efforts, causing his ring to 'break' into seven different rings of the seven Corps, the other six rings flying off to find new wielders while Kyle retained his original Green Lantern ring.

Other versions 
In the Elseworlds tale Green Lantern: Evil's Might, which takes place in 1888, Kyle Rayner is a political cartoonist working under the pen name "Rain or Shine." Formerly an associate with Alan Scott and the Bowery Greens, Kyle broke off his ties with them when Alan killed a seventy-two-year-old shopkeeper named Angus Kelly. Kyle uses the magic ring he found inside the lantern for the benefit of the immigrant masses of New York. Kyle dies near the end in a showdown with Alan Scott, but not until he absorbs Alan into his ring and combines it with Alan's jewel piece. He then takes the bits and pieces of the Statue of Liberty and puts them together, and finally gives Carol her ring and dies in her arms. The story reuses Alan Scott's origin, with Kyle in the main role.
Kyle Rayner is a member of the Green Lantern Marine Corps in Superman: Red Son.
In the Elseworlds story 1001 Emerald Knights, Ibn Rayner is a young sultan being led astray by his evil vizier, taught life lessons by hearing the tales of Al-Jor-Dhan.
A female version of Kyle named Kylie Rayner resides on Earth-11 and is part of that world's Justice League.
In Superman & Batman: Generations, he takes on the role of Green Lantern when Alan Scott decides to retire. He reappears in Generations 2, where he is viciously attacked by Sinestro, before fleeing to the White House. His ring is then used by President Hal Jordan.
In JLA/Avengers, Kyle appears as the JLA's Green Lantern. He helps defeat Terminus by redirecting his staff's energy. During the battle in Metropolis, he attacks the Scarlet Witch and battles the Vision. Afterward, he and Superman go to Santa Rico, but they are attacked by Ms. Marvel and Wonder Man. Wonder Man manages to break Kyle's restraints and nearly defeats him before Superman intervenes. He also joins up with Wonder Woman to find the Spear of Destiny and faces Photon and Quasar. They defeat the two, but Iron Man appears and blasts them. In the Savage Land, Photon finally absorbs Kyle's energy and drains his ring. He uses the Cosmic Cube as a power source, but Ms. Marvel takes it from him. When the two worlds are merged, Kyle is replaced with Hal Jordan as Green Lantern, but during the final battle with Krona, Kyle reappears and helps attack Krona's forces with a weapon created by his ring based on Iron Man's designs.
In JLA: Act of God, Green Lantern is prominently featured. During the "Black Light Event", his power ring went out while he tried to stop Sonar from robbing. This causes Sonar to easily beat him down and escape. The incident made Kyle obsessed with regaining his ring's power, despite the energy being permanently gone. Eventually, he decided to train himself physically with a punching bag. When he learned that the police had trapped Sonar in a warehouse, he ran to the scene. In the fight that ensued, Kyle took down Sonar but was mortally wounded when a shaft of wood pierced his side.
In the distant future, the Book of Oa says that Kyle would help several beings throughout the universe with his White Lantern ring's miracle power.
In the Convergence crossover, Kyle had been a rookie Green Lantern when the dome over Metropolis shut off the powers to him and the rampaging Parallax. Over the course of a year he becomes close friends with Hal Jordan who, lacking powers, is guilt-ridden with the deaths he has caused.
In Star Trek/Green Lantern: The Spectrum War, after Hal Jordan and various other ring-bearers are sent into the new Star Trek universe, Hal mentions that Kyle was killed by Nekron during Nekron's new major assault on the universe.

Collected editions
{| class="wikitable"
|-
! Title !! Material collected !! Publication date !! ISBN
|-
| Green Lantern: Kyle Rayner Vol. 1
| GREEN LANTERN" #48-57 and #0, "R.E.B.E.L.S." '94 #1, "NEW TITANS" #116-117
| October 10, 2017
| 
|-
| Green Lantern: Kyle Rayner Vol. 2
|"Green Lantern #58-65", "Guy Gardner: Warrior" #27-28, "New Titans" #124-125 and "Darkstars" #34
| May 8, 2018
| 
|-
| Green Lantern: Kyle Rayner Vol. 3
| "Green Lantern" #66-75 and "Green Lantern" Annual #4.
| Cancelled
| 
|}

In other media

Television
 Kyle Rayner as Green Lantern appears in series set in the DC Animated Universe (DCAU):
 Rayner first appears in the Superman: The Animated Series episode "In Brightest Day...", voiced by Michael P. Greco. This version is initially a newspaper commercial artist for the Daily Planet before being chosen by Abin Sur to succeed him.
 Rayner makes a non-speaking cameo appearance in the Justice League episode "Hereafter" Pt. 2 as an attendee at Superman's funeral.
 Rayner appears in the Justice League Unlimited episode "The Return", voiced by Will Friedle.
 Kyle Rayner appears in the Mad segment "That's What Super Friends Are For".

Video games
 Kyle Rayner as Green Lantern appears as an unlockable playable character in Justice League Heroes, voiced by John Rubinow.
 Kyle Rayner as Green Lantern appears in DC Universe Online.
 Kyle Rayner as Green Lantern was going to appear as a playable character in a video adaptation of the "Emerald Twilight" storyline for the SNES by Ocean Software before the game was cancelled.
 Kyle Rayner as White Lantern appears as a playable character in Lego Batman 3: Beyond Gotham, voiced by Josh Keaton.

Miscellaneous
 Kyle Rayner as Green Lantern appears in the Justice League of America book Hero's Quest, by Dennis O'Neil. This version was chosen by Ganthet to stop the Guardians of the Universe after they abandoned the Green Lantern Corps to remake the universe.
 Kyle Rayner as Green Lantern appears in the Injustice: Gods Among Us'' prequel comic. After spending a year away, he returns to Earth, only to be intercepted and killed by the Sinestro Corps.

References

External links

Kyle Rayner at the DC Database Project
Green Lantern (1994) at Don Markstein's Toonopedia. Archived from the original on September 1, 2016.

Characters created by Ron Marz
Comics characters introduced in 1994
DC Comics male superheroes
Fictional artists
Fictional avatars
Fictional cartoonists
Fictional characters from Los Angeles 
Fictional characters who can manipulate light 
Fictional characters who can manipulate reality
Fictional characters with energy-manipulation abilities
Fictional characters with death or rebirth abilities
Green Lantern Corps officers
Irish superheroes
Mexican superheroes